Arnoldus van Anthonissen (1631, Amsterdam – 1703, Zierikzee), was a Dutch Golden Age marine painter.

Biography
According to the Rijksbureau voor Kunsthistorische Documentatie (RKD) he was the son of the marine painter Hendrick van Anthonissen, and the grandson of marine painter Aert Anthonisz a.k.a. Aart van Antum. He moved to Leiden in 1660 became a member of the Leiden Guild of St. Luke in 1662. In 1663, he moved to Zierikzee and became a member of the Guild of St. Luke in Middelburg during the years 1665-1669. He is known for seascapes and maps of Schouwen and Duiveland.

References

Arnoldus van Anthonissen on Artnet

1631 births
1703 deaths
Painters from Amsterdam
Dutch Golden Age painters
Dutch male painters
Dutch marine artists
Painters from Leiden
Painters from Middelburg